The First Corps Area was a Corps area (effectively a military district) of the United States Army 1921-1942.

It replaced the Northeastern Department, and was headquartered in Boston Army Base, Massachusetts, encompassing Maine, Massachusetts, New Hampshire, Rhode Island, Vermont and Connecticut. It was responsible for the mobilization, and administration of the First United States Army (1936–38); the Fourth Army, I Army Corps with 9th, 26th, and 43d Divisions; XI Corps, constituted 29 July 1921, with the 76th, 94th, and 97th Division; coast defense units of the First Coast Artillery District, some units of the GHQ Reserve, and the Zone of the Interior support units of the First Corps Area Service Command. First Corps Area was redesignated First CASC in May 1941.

The First Corps Area Training Center was established in 1921 with headquarters at Army Base, Boston, to train Regular Army and Organized Reserve units, as well as ROTC cadets and CMTC candidates. Originally, the training was to be accomplished at Camp Devens, MA, for all arms and services, except cavalry and field artillery, which were to train at Fort Ethan Allen, VT. With the inactivation of the First Corps Area Training Center in 1922, Camp Devens became the primary training center for corps area infantry units only. Air corps units were sent to Mitchel Field, NY; engineer units were sent to Fort Du Pont, DE; and signal corps units were sent to Camp Alfred Vail (later renamed Fort Monmouth), NJ. Corps area maneuvers of Regular Army mobile units were held, those years when funds were available, near Fort Ethan Allen. 

With the adoption of the four field army plan on 1 October 1933, the mobile units of the First Corps Area were reassigned to the First Army or GHQ Reserve, or were demobilized. For the administration of Organized Reserve units, all organizations initially came under the control of the I Corps, or the 76th, 94th, and 97th Divisions. When the XI Corps was inactivated in 1925, the HQ, Non-Divisional Group was established to direct the organization, training, and administration of all nondivisional units. This arrangement was short-lived. On 8 September 1925, the Non-Divisional Group was discontinued and the HQ, Artillery Group was established. This new group managed only the corps area nondivisional field artillery units, the 158th Cavalry Brigade (part of the 64th Cavalry Division, Organized Reserves), and personnel assigned to the I and XI Corps. The rest of the nondivisional units were turned over to the three Organized Reserve divisions for administrative control.

At Brainard Field, a civilian airfield located at Hartford, Connecticut, the 43d Division Aviation (1923–29) and the 118th Observation Squadron (1923–41) trained.

In May 1941 the Corps Area became the First Corps Area Service Command (CASC). Major General Francis B. Wilby was the commanding general from 15 July 1941–11 January 1942. Soon afterwards, the Assistant Chief of Staff, G-2, Brigadier General Sherman Miles, marked for his directorate's intelligence failure before the Attack on Pearl Harbor, was promoted to Major General but then given the relatively unimportant command of First CASC. First CASC was again redesignated First Service Command, part of the Second World War Army Service Forces, on 22 July 1942. By 1943 it had a strength of 31,246. Miles retained command throughout the war.

First Service Command was disestablished in 1946.

References

Bibliography
 - Public Domain - United States Government
 

 1
Military units and formations established in 1920
Military units and formations disestablished in 1942
Military units and formations in Massachusetts